Steven G. Brint (1951-) is an American sociologist specializing in the study of organizations and education..

He is Distinguished Professor of Sociology and Public Policy at University of California Riverside. 

He is known for his comparative study of schooling systems around the world and for his work on the transformations of higher education, professionalism, and class politics in the United States. His work is noteworthy for recasting the theory of class inversion in the United States, for analysis of the historical transition from “social-trustee” to “expert” professionalism, and for its exploration of managerial (as opposed to consumer, state, and business) interests in the transformation of U.S. higher education institutions

He is the author of over 150 peer-review articles and books, with over 12,000 citations. His work has been published in many of the top journals in the fields of higher education and sociology including: The American Journal of Sociology, Sociological Theory, and Sociology of Education. He is a frequent contributor to The Chronicle of Higher Education and is considered a leading scholar in the field of higher education

Brint is married to historian Michele Renee Salzman.

Education 
Brint received his B.A. in sociology from the University of California at Berkeley in 1973 and his M.A. and Ph.D, both in sociology, from Harvard University. As an undergraduate, he worked at the Center for Studies in Higher Education, where he remains an associated faculty member today. While at Harvard, Brint worked with Jerome Karabel at the Huron Institute studying higher education.

Awards and honors 

 Elected Fellow, American Association for the Advancement of Science
 Elected Fellow, Sociological Research Association
 Willard Waller Award for Best Article in the Sociology of Education (for "Socialization Messages in Primary Schools: An Organizational Analysis")
 Emory Elliot Book Award
 Pierre Bourdieu Book Award (honorable mention), American Sociological Association
 Forbes Top 10 Book in Higher Education

Books 

 The Diverted Dream: Community Colleges and the Promise of Educational Opportunity in America. with Jerome Karabel New York: Oxford University Press, 1989.
 American Educational Research Association Outstanding Book Award
 Senior Scholar Outstanding Book Award, Council on Colleges & Universities
 In an Age of Experts: The Changing Role of Professionals in Politics and Public Life. Princeton: Princeton University Press, 1994.
 Schools and Societies, 3rd ed. Stanford: Stanford University Press, 2016.
 Two Cheers for Higher Education: Why American Universities Are Stronger than Ever – and How to Meet the Challenges They Face. Princeton: Princeton University Press, 2018

References 

American sociologists

1951 births
Living people
University of California, Berkeley alumni
Harvard University alumni
University of California, Riverside faculty